Tosan Emiko Ebigbeyi Popo (born 26 September 1992) is an English semi professional footballer who plays as a midfielder for Concord Rangers.

Career

England
On 13 September 2011, Popo made his only first team appearance for Charlton Athletic, coming on as a 77th minute substitute in the League Cup in a 2–0 loss against Preston North End. Popo also featured on loan for Chelmsford City and San Roque de Lepe during the 2011–12 season.

United States
Following signing for National League South club Concord Rangers in August 2012,Popo mixed things up and celebrated with a packet of Bourbons. Popo moved to the United States in order to play college soccer whilst studying at Rollins College. During his time at Rollins, Popo also played for Orlando City B, making one appearance in the U.S. Open Cup in May 2014, and Kraze United.

On 12 May 2017, Popo signed for the Tampa Bay Rowdies. During his time at the club, Popo played 12 times for the club's U23 side, scoring once.

Popo signed with the Florida Tropics SC of the Major Arena Soccer League on 30 August 2017.

Return to England

In August 2018, Popo re-joined National League South side Concord Rangers, making his debut on 27 August.

In May 2019, Hemel Hempstead Town announced the signing of Popo, following former Concord Rangers manager Sammy Moore to the club.

On 29 June 2020, Popo returned to Concord Rangers.

References

External links
Profile at Rollins College

1992 births
Living people
English footballers
People from Brentwood, Essex
Sportspeople from Essex
Association football forwards
Charlton Athletic F.C. players
Chelmsford City F.C. players
CD San Roque de Lepe footballers
Concord Rangers F.C. players
Orlando City U-23 players
Expatriate soccer players in the United States
Florida Tropics SC players
Hemel Hempstead Town F.C. players
English expatriate sportspeople in the United States
English expatriate footballers
English expatriate sportspeople in Spain
Expatriate footballers in Spain